Merouane Anane (born May 31, 1990 in Algiers) is an Algerian footballer. He currently plays for USM El Harrach in the Algerian Ligue 2.

Club career
On September 25, 2010, Anane made his professional debut for CR Belouizdad as a starter against MC Saïda in the first week of the 2010–11 Algerian Ligue Professionnelle 1 . Anane was substituted off in the 60th minute as CR Belouizdad went on to lose 2-1.

International career
On November 30, 2011, Anane was called up to the Algerian Under-23 National Team by manager Azzedine Aït Djoudi for a five-day training camp in Algiers. On November 16, 2011, he was selected as part of Algeria's squad for the 2011 CAF U-23 Championship in Morocco.

References

External links
 
 

1990 births
Living people
Algerian footballers
Algerian Ligue Professionnelle 1 players
Algeria under-23 international footballers
CR Belouizdad players
2011 CAF U-23 Championship players
Algeria youth international footballers
Footballers from Algiers
Association football midfielders
21st-century Algerian people